Bobasi is an electoral constituency in Kenya. It is one of nine constituencies in Kisii County. The constituency was established for the 1988 elections. It was one of three constituencies in the former Gucha District.

Members of Parliament

Wards

Nyamache and Sameta Sub-counties
Bobasi Constituency has two sub-counties within its boundaries: Nyamache and Sameta. Each Sub-county is headed by the sub-county administrator, appointed by a County Public Service Board.

References

External links 
Bobasi Constituency

Constituencies in Kisii County
Constituencies in Nyanza Province
1988 establishments in Kenya
Constituencies established in 1988